Chen Jining (born 4 February 1964) is a Chinese academic and politician who is a member of the Politburo of the Chinese Communist Party and the current Communist Party secretary of Shanghai. An environmental engineer by profession, Chen served as the President of Tsinghua University from 2012 to 2015, Minister of Environmental Protection between 2015 and 2017 and mayor of Beijing from 2017 to 2022.

Early life and education 
Chen was born and raised in Gaizhou, Liaoning, with his ancestral home in Lishu County, Jilin. 

In 1981, he attended Tsinghua University, where he graduated with a Bachelor of Engineering with a major in civil and environmental engineering in 1986. Chen was then educated at Brunel University London, and next at Imperial College London where he earned a Doctor of Philosophy in civil engineering in 1993. After graduation he worked as a research assistant at Imperial College London until 1998.

Career 
In March 1998 he became the Deputy Director of the Environmental Engineering Department of Tsinghua University, rising to Director the next year. In February 2006 he was Vice-President of Tsinghua University, a year later, he was promoted to become the Executive Vice-President. He concurrently served as Dean of the Graduate School of Tsinghua University from January 2010 to February 2012, Dean of the Graduate School at Shenzhen, Tsinghua University between January 2010 to July 2011.

In February 2012, Chen was appointed the President of Tsinghua University, he remained in that position until January 2015, when he was appointed Minister of Environmental Protection, People's Republic of China. At the time of his appointment, he was the youngest member of Li Keqiang's cabinet. In 2015, he was also a member of the judging panel for the Queen Elizabeth Prize for Engineering.

In May 2017, Chen was appointed acting Mayor of Beijing, becoming the 17th person to hold the office since the founding of the People's Republic of China.

Chen was a deputy to the 12th National People's Congress.

He was awarded the Silver Olympic Order after the 2022 Winter Olympics.

References

1964 births
Living people
Alumni of Brunel University London
Alumni of Imperial College London
Biologists from Liaoning
Chinese civil engineers
Chinese ecologists
Chinese Communist Party politicians from Liaoning
Educators from Liaoning
Engineering academics
Engineers from Liaoning
Environmental engineers
Mayors of Beijing
Members of the 20th Politburo of the Chinese Communist Party
Members of the 19th Central Committee of the Chinese Communist Party
Members of the Standing Committee of the 12th National People's Congress
Ministers of Environmental Protection of the People's Republic of China
People from Gaizhou
People's Republic of China politicians from Liaoning
Politicians from Yingkou
Political office-holders in Beijing
Presidents of Tsinghua University
Tsinghua University alumni
Academic staff of Tsinghua University
Recipients of the Olympic Order